The Centralia Zeroes were a Mississippi–Ohio Valley League baseball team based in Centralia, Illinois, USA that played from 1951 to 1952. They played their home games at Fan's Field.

References

Centralia, Illinois
Mississippi-Ohio Valley League
Baseball teams established in 1951
1951 establishments in Illinois
Defunct minor league baseball teams
Defunct baseball teams in Illinois
Professional baseball teams in Illinois
Baseball teams disestablished in 1952
1952 disestablishments in Illinois